Martin Mussard (born 25 February 1990), better known by his stage name Naâman, is a French reggae singer and musician with ska, blues, folk, hip hop and dancehall influences.

Career 
Born in Dieppe, Normandy, he attended the local Catholic private school. He graduated with a literary  baccalauréat and continued studies in communication and graphic arts in Caen and was associated from youth in a local music group Les Young Kha. In 2010, he abandoned his studies to consecrate his time to music.<ref>[http://www.telerama.fr/musique/naaman-petit-prodige-du-reggae-francais,98888.php Telerama: "Naâman, petit prodige du reggae français"] </ref> choosing the name Naâman, from the biblical figure Naaman. He started singing reggae with African and Antilles influences and singing in a Jamaican accent with his band releasing his first independent mixtape  Deep Rockers. He also took part in 2012 in Reggae Sun Ska Festival. His mixtape was well received and buzz increased about his artistry on social networks. In 2012 he travelled to Jamaica to study the Jamaican rasta style with radio VL naming him the reggae revelation of 2013 in addition to the same title during "Victoires du reggae 2013". With his beatmaker Fatbabs he recorded in Studio Harry J, that had recorded some of the music of Bob Marley and the Wailers and returning to France released his album Deep Rockers, Back a Yard on 4 June 2013 promoting the album with a French live tour with additional dates in UK, Russia and China. and a show at Garance Reggae Festival opening for Jon Holt, the famous reggae singer of the 1970s. His album Deep Rockers, Back a Yard was named "Reggae album, French touch 2014". He also publicly supported legal production of cannabis during the professional exposition Expogrow.

In 2015, he released his new album Rays of Resistance in addition to a world tour that took him in addition to his pan-French tour to the Middle East, India, Jamaica. With his friends, he organized a charity concert in May 2015 in Paris in aid of earthquake victims in Nepal shortly after a gig he had in Nepal itself. He was active also in aid of Caritas for helping Migrant Domestic Workers in Lebanon. In July 2015, he also appeared in Les Francofolies de La Rochelle.

 Discography 
Albums

Others
2012: Deep Rockers (mixtape)
2014: From the Deep to the Rock (CD + DVD)
2015: Know Yourself'' (jointly with Massy and Triple)

References

External links 
 

1990 births
Living people
French reggae singers
People from Dieppe, Seine-Maritime
21st-century French singers